Reijo Sundén (born 27 September 1941) is a Finnish rower. He competed in the men's coxed four event at the 1960 Summer Olympics.

References

1941 births
Living people
Finnish male rowers
Olympic rowers of Finland
Rowers at the 1960 Summer Olympics
Sportspeople from Turku